Wind Rose is an Italian power metal band founded in 2009 in Pisa, Tuscany. The band has released five studio albums, most recently Warfront in June 2022. The band play primarily a combination of power metal and folk metal accompanied by orchestration and vocal harmonies, with lyrical themes inspired by the works of J. R. R. Tolkien, especially Tolkien's Dwarves, from which the band also gets their aesthetic; because of this, the band's sound has been referred to as Dwarven Metal.

History
In March 2010, a few months after their formation, Wind Rose released a CD called "Demo 2010" which was produced by Cristiano Bertocchi. On 28 August 2012 Wind Rose released their first full-length Shadows Over Lothadruin via Bakerteam Records (secondary division of Scarlet Records).

In 2013/2014 they performed a number of promotional live shows in Europe directly supporting Wintersun, Finntroll and Epica. Cristiano Bertocchi joined the band as bass player during 2014 before the band went to the studio to record the second full-length album.

In February 2015, they took part in Eluveitie's Origins European tour and their second studio album Wardens of the West Wind was released by Scarlet Records. In October they also played as support for Ensiferum's Spanish shows during their One Man Army European tour. After these shows, Wind Rose dedicated the entire year 2016 to writing new material. In 2017, the band signed a deal with Inner Wound Recordings for their third album Stonehymn. It was released in May. The first video to be released was "The Wolves' Call" followed by "To Erebor" which gave more popularity to the band, reaching millions of contacts on their Facebook and on YouTube outlets. Wind Rose was then invited to participate in important metal festivals such as Bloodstock (United Kingdom) and Masters of Rock (Czech Republic).

In January 2018, the band was asked to tour Japan with Ensiferum, and in April and May 2018 they joined the Path to Glory European tour with Ensiferum and Ex Deo. In December 2018, Wind Rose announced a deal with Napalm Records and the recording of a new album. On 6 June 2019 Wind Rose released the first single on Napalm: "Diggy Diggy Hole", a song originally written and performed by gaming YouTubers The Yogscast. As of June 2022, the video has been viewed over 34 million times. The album Wintersaga was released on 27 September 2019.

On 8 March 2022, the band announced their new album, Warfront, would be released on 10 June.

Members
Francesco Cavalieri – lead vocals (2009–present)
Claudio Falconcini – guitars, backing vocals (2009–present)
Federico Meranda – keyboards (2009–present)
Cristiano Bertocchi – bass, backing vocals (2014–present)
Federico Gatti – drums (2018–present)

Discography

Studio albums
Shadows Over Lothadruin (2012)
Wardens of the West Wind (2015)
Stonehymn (2017)
Wintersaga (2019)
Warfront (2022)

Singles
"The Returning Race" (2017)
"To Erebor" (2017)
"Diggy Diggy Hole" (2019)
"Drunken Dwarves" (2019)
"Wintersaga" (2019)
"Diggy Diggy Hole (Dance Remix)" (2020)
"We Were Warriors" (2020)
 "Gates of Ekrund" (2022)
 Together We Rise (2022)
 Fellows Of The Hammer (2022)

Demos
Demo 2010 (2010)

References

External links

Italian power metal musical groups
Napalm Records artists
Music based on Middle-earth